Dinies Camp is a univallate Iron Age hill fort enclosure in the Mendip district of Somerset, England. The hill fort is considered to be medieval as it is on the site of earlier earthwork.

Background

See also
List of hill forts and ancient settlements in Somerset

References

History of Somerset
Hill forts in Somerset
Iron Age sites in England
Scheduled monuments in Mendip District